The Bradford Bulls Women are an English professional women's rugby league team based in Bradford, West Yorkshire.  Formed in 1999 as an autonomous club, Dudley Hill Thunderbirds, the team was also known as Bradford Thunderbirds and Bradford Clayton Thunderbirds. As the Thunderbirds the club played in the  Women's Rugby League Conference and later the Women's Rugby League.

History

1999–2011: Origins
The club were founded in 1999 as Dudley Hill Thunderbirds to partner the men's Dudley Hill team. Later on the Thunderbirds and Dudley Hill split and became Bradford Clayton Thunderbirds to reflect playing in the Clayton area of Bradford and later just becoming Bradford Thunderbirds. Since there was no official league for many years they played sporadic fixtures until leagues started being formed such as the Women's Rugby League Conference in 2008 which gave the Thunderbirds and women's rugby league more competitive games. They also won regional leagues of the competition.

2012–2013: Challenge Cup
The RFL Women's Challenge Cup was founded in 2012 to give the Women's Conference a competitive cup competition. Bradford had some early success in the cup appearing in the first two editions, losing both to Featherstone Rovers and Thatto Heath Crusaders respectively.

2014–2016: Women's Rugby League
In 2012 the club entered the newly formed RFL Women's Rugby League alongside mostly men's community clubs that ran a women's team. The club won their first major trophy in the first season after they lost a third consecutive Challenge Cup Final to Thatto Heath Crusaders 32–24.

After the early success and more popularity in Bradford women's rugby league, the club dropped the Thunderbirds moniker and linked up with the Bradford Bulls adopting the Bulls' colours, name and playing at Odsal Stadium. In their first season as the Bulls they reached a second Grand Final in three years, although they lost 36-8 to treble winners Thatto Heath Crusaders.

2017–present: Super League
After the 2016 season the Women's Rugby League was disbanded and new competition was set up. The Women's Super League was set up in 2017 to give the sport a bigger profile and more professionalism. The first edition featured only four clubs with Bradford finishing first at the end of the season and going onto win the Grand Final 36–6 against Featherstone.  This win completed a league and cup double for the team as earlier in the season they had won the Women's Challenge Cup beating Featherstone Ladies 50–16.

Players

2023 Squad

Seasons

Honours

Leagues
Super League / Women's Rugby League
Winners (2): 2014, 2017
Runners up (1): 2016

Cups
Challenge Cup
Winners (1): 2017
Runners up (3): 2012, 2013, 2014

References

Bradford Bulls
1999 establishments in England
Rugby clubs established in 1999
Sport in Bradford
Women's rugby league teams in England
Rugby league teams in West Yorkshire
RFL Women's Super League